Maya Paczuski is the head and founder of the Complexity Science Group at the University of Calgary. She is a well-cited physicist whose work spans self-organized criticality, avalanche dynamics, earthquake, and complex networks.  She was born in Israel in 1963, but grew up in the United States.  Maya Paczuski received a B.S. and M.S. in Electrical Engineering and Computer Science from M.I.T. in 1986 and then went on to study with Mehran Kardar, earning her Ph.D in Condensed matter physics from the same institute.

Before founding the Complexity Science Group at the University of Calgary, she held appointments at numerous institutions around the world, most notably, M.I.T., Brookhaven National Laboratory, the Niels Bohr Institute (Copenhagen, Denmark), the University of Houston, NORDITA (Copenhagen, Denmark), Imperial College London, the von Neumann Institute for Computing at Forschungszentrum Jülich, and the Perimeter Institute for Theoretical Physics, where she organized and ran the first complex systems and statistical physics program.  Paczuski was married to the late Danish theoretical physicist Per Bak, with whom she has coauthored papers.

See also
 Self-organized criticality
 Geophysics
 Complexity
 Boolean network
 Complex network
 Aftershock

Selected publications

References

External links
 Maya Paczuski's Homepage

Canadian physicists
Academic staff of the University of Calgary
Living people
Canadian women physicists
American women scientists
Israeli women scientists
Israeli women physicists
1963 births
Canadian women scientists
American women academics